Maryannu is an ancient word for the caste of chariot-mounted hereditary warrior nobility, which existed in many of the societies of the Middle East during the Bronze Age.

The term is attested in the Amarna letters written by Haapi. Robert Drews writes that the name maryannu, although plural, takes the singular marya, which in Sanskrit means 'young warrior', and attaches a Hurrian suffix.

See also

 Bronze Age Collapse: changes in warfare

References

Further reading
 
 
 

Amarna letters
Indo-Aryan peoples
Indo-European warfare
Mitanni
Ancient warfare